Rhododendron sikangense (川西杜鹃) is a rhododendron species native to western Sichuan and northeastern Yunnan in China (the area of the former province of Sikang for which it is named), where it grows at altitudes of . The flowers are white, purple, or pink, with purple flecks.

References

"Rhododendron sikangense", W. P. Fang, Acta Phytotax. Sin. 2: 81. 1952.

sikangense